Atelopus andinus, sometimes known as the Andes stubfoot toad, is a species of toad in the family Bufonidae. It is endemic to eastern Peru.

References

andinus
Amphibians of Peru
Endemic fauna of Peru
Amphibians described in 1968
Taxa named by Juan A. Rivero
Taxonomy articles created by Polbot